This is a list of lists of films produced in the Tulu cinema and in the Tulu language.

 List of Tulu films of 2014
 List of Tulu films of 2015
 List of Tulu films of 2016
 List of Tulu films of 2017
 List of Tulu films of 2018
 List of Tulu films of 2019
 List of Tulu films of 2020
 List of Tulu films of 2021
 List of Tulu films of 2022

References

Lists of Indian films
Lists of films by language